André Beaunier (22 September 1869, Évreux – 9 December 1925, Paris) was a French novelist and literary critic.

Life
The son of an 'avoué' (legal official) in Évreux, Beaunier entered the École normale supérieure in 1890.

He was the literary reviewer for the Revue des deux Mondes in 1912 then editor and drama critic for l'Écho de Paris in 1916. During the 1920s he lived in Le Vésinet.

In 1908 he married opera singer Jeanne Raunay. He died suddenly in December 1925.

Works 

 Les Dupont-Leterrier, Paris, 1900
 La Poésie nouvelle, Paris, 1902
 Bonshommes de Paris, Paris, 1902
 L'Art de regarder les tableaux, Émile Lévy, Paris, 1906
 Éloges, Paris, 1909
 Les Idées et les Hommes, Plon-Nourrit, Paris
 Les Limites du cœur, Fasquelle, Paris, 1910
 Les Carnets de Joseph Joubert
 La Crise, three-act comedy, co-written with Paul Bourget (Premiered at Théâtre de la Porte Saint-Martin, 3 May 1912)
 Suzanne et le plaisir, 1921

References 

1869 births
1925 deaths
20th-century French novelists
20th-century French male writers
French literary critics
People from Évreux
French male non-fiction writers